Shawn Kenneth Richards (born 8 December 1972) is a Saint Kitts and Nevis politician from People's Action Movement.

In politics
Richards has been the leader of the People's Action Movement since 2012, and a member of the National Assembly of Saint Kitts and Nevis. In the 2010 elections, he defeated Norgen Wilson of the Saint Kitts and Nevis Labour Party to gain re-election to his seat. Richards was the Deputy Prime Minister of Saint Kitts and Nevis from 2015 until 2022, when he was fired by Timothy Harris upon the collapse of Team Unity.

Other activities
Richards did his higher education in the United States at Cleveland State University and then the University of the Virgin Islands. He qualified as a Certified Public Accountant in 2002 and worked as an auditor in Saint Kitts and Nevis. He renounced United States citizenship in 2009 during the debate on the National Assembly Elections (Amendment) Bill, which barred dual citizens from standing for election.

References

External links
Profile for Shawn Richards on the website of the Government of Saint Kitts and Nevis

1972 births
Living people
Cleveland State University alumni
Deputy Prime Ministers of Saint Kitts and Nevis
Government ministers of Saint Kitts and Nevis
Members of the National Assembly (Saint Kitts and Nevis)
People's Action Movement politicians
Former United States citizens
University of the Virgin Islands alumni